Christos Kelpekis (born 22 August 1973) is a Greek football coach and a former football goalkeeper. He is the goalkeepers' coach with the Russian club Krasnodar.

References

1973 births
Living people
Greek footballers
Kampaniakos F.C. players
Kalamata F.C. players
Iraklis Thessaloniki F.C. players
Apollon Pontou FC players
Makedonikos F.C. players
Anagennisi Giannitsa F.C. players
Super League Greece players
Association football goalkeepers
PAOK FC non-playing staff
Maccabi Tel Aviv F.C. non-playing staff
Footballers from Central Macedonia
People from Thessaloniki (regional unit)
Greek expatriate sportspeople in Israel
Greek expatriate sportspeople in England
Greek expatriate sportspeople in Russia